Peak phosphorus is a concept to describe the point in time when humanity reaches the maximum global production rate of phosphorus as an industrial and commercial raw material. The term is used in an equivalent way to the better-known term peak oil. The issue was raised as a debate on whether phosphorus shortages might be imminent around 2010, which was largely dismissed after USGS and other organizations increased world estimates on available phosphorus resources, mostly in the form of additional resources in Morocco. However, exact reserve quantities remain uncertain, as do the possible impacts of increased phosphate use on future generations. This is important because rock phosphate is a key ingredient in many inorganic fertilizers. Hence, a shortage in rock phosphate (or just significant price increases) might negatively affect the world's food security. 

Phosphorus is a finite (limited) resource that is widespread in the Earth's crust and in living organisms but is relatively scarce in concentrated forms, which are not evenly distributed across the Earth. The only cost-effective production method to date is the mining of phosphate rock, but only a few countries have significant commercial reserves. The top five are Morocco (including reserves located in Western Sahara), China, Egypt, Algeria and Syria. Estimates for future production vary significantly depending on modelling and assumptions on extractable volumes, but it is inescapable that future production of phosphate rock will be heavily influenced by Morocco in the foreseeable future.

Means of commercial phosphorus production besides mining are few because the phosphorus cycle does not include significant gas-phase transport. The predominant source of phosphorus in modern times is phosphate rock (as opposed to the guano that preceded it). According to some researchers, Earth's commercial and affordable phosphorus reserves are expected to be depleted in 50–100 years and peak phosphorus to be reached in approximately 2030. Others suggest that supplies will last for several hundreds of years. As with the timing of peak oil, the question is not settled, and researchers in different fields regularly publish different estimates of the rock phosphate reserves.

Background

The peak phosphorus concept is connected with the concept of planetary boundaries. Phosphorus, as part of biogeochemical processes, belongs to one of the nine "Earth system processes" which are known to have boundaries. As long as the boundaries are not crossed, they mark the "safe zone" for the planet.

Estimates of world phosphate reserves

The accurate determination of peak phosphorus is dependent on knowing the total world's commercial phosphate reserves and resources, especially in the form of phosphate rock (a summarizing term for over 300 ores of different origin, composition, and phosphate content). "Reserves" refers to the amount assumed recoverable at current market prices and "resources" refers to estimated amounts of such a grade or quality that they have reasonable prospects for economic extraction.

Unprocessed phosphate rock has a concentration of 1.7-8.7% phosphorus by mass (4-20% phosphorus pentoxide). By comparison, the Earth's crust contains 0.1% phosphorus by mass, and vegetation 0.03% to 0.2%. Although quadrillions of tons of phosphorus exist in the Earth's crust, these are currently not economically extractable.

In 2021, the United States Geological Survey (USGS) estimated that economically extractable phosphate rock reserves worldwide are 71 billion tons, while world mining production in 2020 was 223 million tons. Assuming zero growth, the reserves would thus last for 260 years. This broadly confirms a 2010 International Fertilizer Development Center (IFDC) report that global reserves would last for several hundred years. Phosphorus reserve figures are intensely debated. Gilbert suggest that there has been little external verification of the estimate. A 2014 review concluded that the IFDC report "presents an inflated picture of global reserves, in particular those of Morocco, where largely hypothetical and inferred resources have simply been relabeled “reserves".

The countries with most phosphate rock commercial reserves (in billion metric tons): Morocco 50, China 3.2, Egypt 2.8, Algeria 2.2, Syria 1.8, Brazil 1.6, Saudi Arabia 1.4, South Africa 1.4,  Australia 1.1, United States 1.0, Finland 1.0, Russia 0.6, Jordan 0.8.

Rock phosphate shortages (or just significant price increases) might negatively affect the world's food security. Many agricultural systems depend on supplies of inorganic fertilizer, which use rock phosphate. Under the food production regime in developed countries, shortages of rock phosphate could lead to shortages of inorganic fertilizer, which could in turn reduce the global food production.

Economists have pointed out that price fluctuations of rock phosphate do not necessarily indicate peak phosphorus, as these have already occurred due to various demand- and supply-side factors.

United States

US production of phosphate rock peaked in 1980 at 54.4 million metric tons. The United States was the world's largest producer of phosphate rock from at least 1900, up until 2006, when US production was exceeded by that of China. In 2019, the US produced 10 percent of the world's phosphate rock.

Exhaustion of guano reserves

In 1609 Garcilaso de la Vega wrote the book "Comentarios Reales" in which he described many of the agricultural practices of the Incas prior to the arrival of the Spaniards and introduced the use of guano as a fertilizer. As Garcilaso described, the Incas near the coast harvested guano. In the early 1800s Alexander von Humboldt introduced guano as a source of agricultural fertilizer to Europe after having discovered it on islands off the coast of South America. The guano had previously been used by the Moche people as a source of fertilizer by mining it and transporting it back to Peru by boat. International commerce in guano didn't start until after 1840. By the start of the 20th century guano had been nearly completely depleted and was eventually overtaken with the discovery of methods of production of superphosphate.

Phosphorus conservation and recycling

Overview 
Phosphorus can be transferred from the soil in one location to another as food is transported across the world, taking the phosphorus it contains with it. Once consumed by humans, it can end up in the local environment (in the case of open defecation which is still widespread on a global scale) or in rivers or the ocean via sewage systems and sewage treatment plants in the case of cities connected to sewer systems. An example of one crop that takes up large amounts of phosphorus is soy.

In an effort to postpone the onset of peak phosphorus several methods of reducing and reusing phosphorus are in practice, such as in agriculture and in sanitation systems. The Soil Association, the UK organic agriculture certification and pressure group, issued a report in 2010 "A Rock and a Hard Place" encouraging more recycling of phosphorus.  One potential solution to the shortage of phosphorus is greater recycling of human and animal wastes back into the environment.

Agricultural practices 
Reducing agricultural runoff and soil erosion can slow the frequency with which farmers have to reapply phosphorus to their fields. Agricultural methods such as no-till farming, terracing, contour tilling, and the use of windbreaks have been shown to reduce the rate of phosphorus depletion from farmland. These methods are still dependent on a periodic application of phosphate rock to the soil and as such methods to recycle the lost phosphorus have also been proposed. Perennial vegetation, such as grassland or forest, is much more efficient in its use of phosphate than arable land. Strips of grassland and/or forest between arable land and rivers can greatly reduce losses of phosphate and other nutrients.

Integrated farming systems which use animal sources to supply phosphorus for crops do exist at smaller scales, and application of the system to a larger scale is a potential alternative for supplying the nutrient, although it would require significant changes to the widely adopted modern crop fertilizing methods.

Excreta reuse 

The oldest method of recycling phosphorus is through the reuse of animal manure and human excreta in agriculture. Via this method, phosphorus in the foods consumed are excreted, and the animal or human excreta are subsequently collected and re-applied to the fields. Although this method has maintained civilizations for centuries the current system of manure management is not logistically geared towards application to crop fields on a large scale. At present, manure application could not meet the phosphorus needs of large scale agriculture. Despite that, it is still an efficient method of recycling used phosphorus and returning it to the soil.

Sewage sludge 
Sewage treatment plants that have an enhanced biological phosphorus removal step produce a sewage sludge that is rich in phosphorus. Various processes have been developed to extract phosphorus from sewage sludge directly, from the ash after incineration of the sewage sludge or from other products of sewage sludge treatment. This includes the extraction of phosphorus rich materials such as struvite from waste processing plants. The struvite can be made by adding magnesium to the waste. Some companies such as Ostara in Canada and NuReSys in Belgium are already using this technique to recover phosphate. Ostara has eight operating plants worldwide.

Research on phosphorus recovery methods from sewage sludge has been carried out in Sweden and Germany since around 2003, but the technologies currently under development are not yet cost effective, given the current price of phosphorus on the world market.

See also
Hubbert peak theory
Malthusianism

References

Phosphorus
Phosphorus